Dura  is a genus of tussock moths in the family Erebidae. The genus was erected by Frederic Moore in 1879.

Species
The genus includes the following species:

References

Lymantriini
Noctuoidea genera